Scott Adams (born 17 March 1971 in Sydney, New South Wales) is an Australian Paralympic skier. He was from Toongabbie and lives in Kimberley, British Columbia, Canada. He is a below-knee amputee (LW4 classification).

At the 2002 Winter Paralympics, he competed in four events - 12th in the Men's Downhill LW4, 9th in the  Men's Slalom LW4 and did not finish in the Men's Giant Slalom LW4 and Men's Super-G LW4. At the 2006 Winter Paralympics, he competed in four events - 40th in the Men's Downhill standing, 40th in the Men's Giant Slalom standing, 38th  Men's Slalom standing and 46th in the Men's Super-G standing.

References 

1971 births
Australian male alpine skiers
Alpine skiers at the 2002 Winter Paralympics
Alpine skiers at the 2006 Winter Paralympics
Paralympic alpine skiers of Australia
Sportsmen from New South Wales
Living people
Skiers from Sydney